Dim Sum: A Little Bit of Heart is a 1985 American comedy film directed by Wayne Wang and starring Laureen Chew, Kim Chew, Victor Wong, Ida F. O. Chung, Cora Miao, Amy Hill, and Joan Chen.

Plot
A Chinese immigrant widow faces the New Year with apprehension after it was foretold that it would be the year she would die. All of the things she wants to do before she dies come into focus, including seeing her daughter married and visiting China one last time to pay her respects.

Cast
Laureen Chew as Geraldine Tam
Kim Chew as Mrs. Tam
Victor Wong as Uncle Tam
Ida F.O. Chung as Auntie May
Cora Miao as Julia
John Nishio as Richard
Amy Hill as Amy Tam
Keith Choy as Kevin Tam
Mary Chew as Old M.J. player
Nora Lee as Old M.J. player
Joan Chen as Young M.J. player
Rita Yee as Young M.J. player
George Woo as Bar patron
Elsa Cruz Pearson as Eliza
Helen Chew as Linda Tam
Jarrett Chew as Baby Tam

Critical reception
Dim Sum: A Little Bit of Heart was met with critical acclaim. The film has an rating of 88% (out of a possible 100%) on Rotten Tomatoes based on 8 reviews.

Roger Ebert of the Chicago Sun-Times awarded the film 3 out of 4 stars and wrote "What is remarkable is the way Wang deals with this complex set of emotions, in a movie that is essentially a comedy."

Gallery

References

External links
 
http://caamfest.com/2014//
http://www.nytimes.com/movie/review?res=9900EFD81138F93AA3575BC0A963948260

1985 films
1985 comedy films
American independent films
Films about Chinese Americans
Chinatown, San Francisco
Films directed by Wayne Wang
Films set in San Francisco
Films set in the San Francisco Bay Area
Films shot in San Francisco
Comedy films about Asian Americans
1985 independent films
1980s English-language films
1980s American films